Sir Jonathan Mark Marsden,  (born 1960) is an art historian, curator and courtier.

Marsden was a curator with the National Trust before joining the Royal Collection, one of the five departments in the Royal Household, in 1996. He was Deputy Surveyor of The Queen's Works of Art, responsible for curating decorative arts, until he succeeded Sir Hugh Roberts to become Surveyor of the Queen's Works of Art and Director of the Royal Collection on 1 May 2010. As Director of the Royal Collection, Marsden chairs the Royal Collection Management Committee. He resigned in December 2017.

He was a trustee of the Georgian Group from 1995 to 2005. He was the honorary editorial secretary of the Furniture History Society from 2005 to 2011, and editor of Furniture History from 2006 to 2011.

He is a trustee of  the Art Fund, the City and Guilds of London Art School, Historic Royal Palaces, the Royal Yacht Britannia Trust, and the Household Cavalry Museum Trust.

Marsden was appointed a Lieutenant of the Royal Victorian Order (LVO) in the 2003 Birthday Honours and was promoted to Commander (CVO) in the 2013 New Year Honours. On his retirement, he was appointed a Knight Commander of the Royal Victorian Order (KCVO) on 19 December 2017.

References
 Appointment of new Director of the Royal Collection, The Royal Collection,  16 July 2009
 Current Trustees, Historic Royal Palaces
 Board of Trustees, Royal Yacht Britannia Trust
 Meet our Trustees, The Art Fund
 Trustees, City and Guilds of London Art School

1960 births
British art historians
Knights Commander of the Royal Victorian Order
Directors of the Royal Collection
Fellows of the Society of Antiquaries of London
Living people
Surveyors of the Queen's Works of Art